Rhabdophloeus is a genus of beetles in the family Laemophloeidae, containing the following species:

 Rhabdophloeus chiriquensis Sharp
 Rhabdophloeus concolor Sharp
 Rhabdophloeus costatus Grouvelle
 Rhabdophloeus dispar Sharp
 Rhabdophloeus horni Casey

References

Laemophloeidae
Cucujoidea genera